The 2019 Minnesota United FC season is the tenth season of Minnesota United FC's existence and their third season in Major League Soccer, the top-tier of American soccer. United plays at Allianz Field and is coached by Adrian Heath. Outside of MLS, Minnesota United will also participate in the 2019 U.S. Open Cup, as well as various preseason competitions.
It was also the first year that Minnesota United played at Allianz Field.

Club

Transfers

Transfers in

MLS SuperDraft

Any player marked with a * is part of the Generation Adidas program.

Transfers out

Loans in

Loans out

Friendlies

Competitions

Overview

{| class="wikitable" style="text-align: center"
|-
!rowspan=2|Competition
!colspan=8|Record
|-
!
!
!
!
!
!
!
!
|-
|MLS

|-
|U.S. Open Cup

|-
|MLS Cup Playoffs

|-
!Total

MLS

Overall table

Results summary

Results by round

Matches

MLS Cup Playoffs

First round

U.S. Open Cup

Statistics

Player statistics

Appearances (Apps.) numbers are for appearances in competitive games only including sub appearances
Red card numbers denote: Numbers in parentheses represent red cards overturned for wrongful dismissal.

Clean sheets

Attendance

By game

References

2019
2019 Major League Soccer season
American soccer clubs 2019 season
2019 in sports in Minnesota